The 1922 Villanova Wildcats football team represented the Villanova University during the 1922 college football season. The Wildcats team captain was William Cronin.

Schedule

References

Villanova
Villanova Wildcats football seasons
Villanova Wildcats football